Joseph Webster may refer to:

 Eddie Webster (Joseph Edward Webster, 1902–1945), British long-distance runner
 Joseph Dana Webster (1811–1876), American civil engineer and soldier
 Joseph Philbrick Webster (1819–1875), American songwriter and composer
 Joseph Samuel Webster (died 1796), English portrait painter 
 Joe Webster (footballer) (1886–1927), English football goalkeeper
 Joe Webster (politician), member of the Pennsylvania House of Representatives